Cyrine Abdelnour (also spelled Cyrine Abd Al-Nour or Cyrine Abdel-Nour; born 21 February 1977) is a popular Lebanese singer, actress, and model.

Her first album, Leila Min Layali, was released in 2004. She released her second album, Aleik Ayouni in 2006, with debut single "Law Bas Fe Aini" (If he looks in my eyes) becoming one of the most popular Egyptian songs of the year. Abdelnour has also starred in Arabic TV serials and films since the late 1990s and has been awarded four Murex D'or awards for best Lebanese actress.

Early life
Abdelnour was born in Abadiyeh to a Lebanese tailor father named Elias, and a nurse mother of Greek descent named Sylvie Cattouf who is also a follower of the Greek Orthodox faith. She initially studied accounting until 1993, but she wanted to pursue a modeling career.

Career
In 1992, Abdelnour started her modeling career and modeled for the fashion designers Feliciana Rossi, Zuhair Murad, Abed Mahfouz, Renato Balestra, Mireille Dagher, and Thierry Mugler. In 1994, she featured in George Wassouf's music video "Kalam El Nass".

In 1998, she had her first roles with the Lebanese Broadcasting Corporation, with Smaa Kchaa (1998) and Sahat Sahteen (1999) being her first roles of note. In 2002, Abdelnour was awarded the title "Model of the World" at the Regency Palace Hotel in Beirut. In 2003, she starred in the Arabic series Dareb Khwet as Ebanati, winning the 2003 Murex d'Or award for best Lebanese actress for the role. She played another leading role in the series Mariana (1998). In 2004, she starred in the serial Ghariba, and in 2007 the LBC series The Prisoner. In 2009–2010, she starred in Sarah, another series on MTV Lebanon.

In 2008, she starred in the Egyptian film Ramadan Mabrouk Abul-Alamein Hamouda and the Lebanese-Egyptian Smoke Without Fire, and the following year appeared in the Egyptian TV series Al Adham and the film Al Mosafer (The Traveller) with Omar Sharif, which was shown at the 66th Venice Film Festival.
In 2012, Cyrine starred in the Lebanese series Ruby, and in 2013, she starred in Lobat El-Mot (Death game). In 2004, she released her debut album, Leila min El Layali. Her third album with her record label (Rotana) was released in 2009, titled Layali El Hob (Nights of Love). 
As of 2016, she was one of the highest paid actresses in Lebanon. In 2019, Cyrine starred in "Al-Hayba - The Harvest" (Arabic: الهيبة الحصاد) with Syrian actor Taim Hassan and the TV series was a huge success. She then starred with Lebanese actor Adel Karam in a 15 episode TV series named "Dor El Omor " (Arabic: دور العمر) where she is a mentally ill young woman with a painful past.

Personal life
Abdelnour is married to Lebanese businessman Farid Rahme. In 2007, she gave birth to their first child, a daughter named Talia. Abdelnour is a practicing Christian. In 2015, after being attacked by many cyber trolls for celebrating Easter of that year, she defended her religious beliefs during an interview with Al Ghad Radio. Cyrine Abdelnour stated to the hosts, "I'm Christian and it's not like I surprised anyone with the news. It's all our fault (artists) for not discussing our religion in public." Her online harassment during Easter marked an event, which saw many other Arab Christians celebrities being harassed by extremists for celebrating Easter openly.
In March 2018, she gave birth to her son, Cristiano Rahme.

Filmography

Videography 
Leila Min El Layli (2004)
Sidfi Ana (2004)
Erga'a Tani (2005)
Law Bas Fi Eini (2006)
Aalik Ayouni (2007)
Sajeena (2007)
Bilougha Alarabiya Elfousha (2008)
Elly Malakishi Fi (2008)
Omri Ma'ak (2009)
Sarah (2010)
Ruby (2012)
 Habaybi (2013)
  Aadi (2015)
 Bhebak Ya Mhazab (2016)
 Eza Beddak Yani (2017)
 Leila (2020)

Discography 
Leila Min El Layli (2004)
Aalik Ayouni (2006)
Layali Al Hob (2008)
Habaybi (2013)

References

External links

 

1977 births
Living people
21st-century Lebanese women singers
Rotana Records artists
Lebanese television actresses
Lebanese film actresses
20th-century Lebanese actresses
21st-century Lebanese actresses
Lebanese female models
Lebanese people of Greek descent
Greek Orthodox Christians from Lebanon
Singers who perform in Classical Arabic
Singers who perform in Egyptian Arabic
People from Baabda District